This is an inclusive list of science fiction television programs whose names begin with the letter I.

I
Live-action
Ijon Tichy: Space Pilot (2007, Germany)
Immortal, The (1970–1971)
Immortal, The (2000, Canada) IMDb
Incorporated (2016–2017)
Incredible Hulk, The (franchise):
Incredible Hulk, The (1977–1982)
Incredible Hulk Returns, The (1988, film)
Trial of the Incredible Hulk, The (1989, film)
Death of the Incredible Hulk, The (1990, film)
Infinite Worlds of H. G. Wells, The a.k.a. The Scientist (2001, UK/US, miniseries, anthology)
Inhumans (2017)
Interpretaris, The (1966) IMDb
Interster (1983, South Africa, puppetry)
Into the Badlands (2015–2018)
Intruders (1992, film)
Invaders, The (1967–1968)
Invaders from Space (1964, film)
Invasion (1997, film)
Invasion (2005–2006)
Invasion (2021–present)
Invasion: Earth (1998, UK)
Invisible Man, The (franchise):
Invisible Man, The (1958, UK)
Invisible Man, The (1975)
Invisible Man, The (1984, UK)
Invisible Man, The (2000)
Iron King (1972–1973, Japan)
Island City (1994, film, pilot)
It's About Time (1966–1967)

Animation
Incredible Hulk, The (1982–1983, animated)
Incredible Hulk, The a.k.a. Incredible Hulk and She-Hulk, The (1996–1997, animated)
Hulk and the Agents of S.M.A.S.H. (2013–2015, animated)
Infinite Ryvius (1999–2000, Japan, animated)
Infinite Stratos (2011–2013, Japan, animated)
Inhumanoids (1986, animated)
Inspector Gadget (franchise):
Inspector Gadget (1983–1986, Canada/France/Japan/US, animated)
Inspector Gadget Saves Christmas (1992, animated)
Gadget Boy & Heather (1995, France, animated)
Inspector Gadget's Field Trip (1996–1998, animated)
Gadget and the Gadgetinis (2001–2003, Canada, animated)
Inspector Gadget (2015–2018, Canada/US, animated)
Invader Zim (2001–2002, 2004, animated)
Invasion America (1998, miniseries, animated)
Invincible Steel Man Daitarn 3 a.k.a. Unchallengeable Daitarn 3, The (1978–1979, Japan, animated)
Invincible Super Man Zambot 3 a.k.a. Super Machine Zambot 3 (1977–1978, Japan, animated)
Invisible Man, The (2005, France, animated)
Iron Man (franchise):
Iron Man (1994–1996, animated)
Iron Man: Armored Adventures (2009–2012, animated)
Marvel Anime: Iron Man (2010, Japan, animated)
Irresponsible Captain Tylor, The (1993–1996, Japan, animated)

References

Television programs, I